BiondVax Pharmaceuticals Ltd. is an Israeli biopharmaceutical company focused on developing, manufacturing and commercializing innovative immunotherapeutic products primarily for the treatment of infectious diseases and autoimmune diseases. BiondVax is a publicly traded company, listed on the Nasdaq.

In collaboration with the prestigious Max Planck Institute for Multidisciplinary Sciences (MPG) and the University Medical Center Göttingen (UMG), both in Germany, BiondVax is developing a pipeline of innovative nanosized antibody (NanoAb) therapies addressing diseases underserved by current treatments and with large and growing markets, such as COVID-19, asthma and psoriasis.

History

Since its founding, BiondVax has executed eight clinical trials, including a seven-country, 12,400-participant Phase 3 trial of a prior influenza vaccine candidate, and it built, owns and operates a 20,000 sq. ft. state-of-the-art GMP biologics manufacturing facility housing its laboratories, production facilities and offices.

In December 2021, BiondVax signed definitive agreements with the Max Planck Society – parent organization of the Max Planck Institute for Multidisciplinary Sciences– and the UMG to enter a strategic collaboration for the development and commercialization of innovative COVID-19 NanoAbs.

The company is planning a rapid development path that leverages its expertise and capabilities in biological drug development and manufacturing. BiondVax anticipates preclinical proof-of-concept results for an inhaled COVID-19 NanoAb by the end of 2022, with initial Phase 1/2a human clinical trial results expected in 2023.

The intended inhaled mechanism of delivery of BiondVax’s COVID-19 NanoAb formulation may serve as a significant differentiator when compared to approved monoclonal antibodies, which are injected. Inhaled delivery has shown to be cheaper, more convenient and likely safer for patients and providers.

Management Team

Amir Reichman is BiondVax’s CEO. He previously was Head of Global Vaccines Engineering Core Technologies at GSK plc in Belgium. Prior to that, he held leadership roles at Novartis Vaccines’ Global Vaccines Supply Chain Management organization. He was the first employee of NeuroDerm Ltd., a company focused on transdermal drug delivery, and served as Senior Scientist until his departure in 2009. He earned a M.Sc. in Biotechnology Engineering from Ben-Gurion University of the Negev and an MBA in Finance and Health Care Management from the University of Pennsylvania’s Wharton School of the University of Pennsylvania.

Tamar Ben-Yedidia, Ph.D., is Chief Science Officer at BiondVax. She has more than 30 years of experience in immunology, with specific expertise in the development of vaccines. She began her career with Biotechnology General Ltd., working on development of a recombinant Hepatitis B vaccine. She later joined the Weizmann Institute of Science, working on the design of a peptide-based vaccine against several pathogens. She is widely published, with numerous refereed articles and invited reviews in various scientific journals. She received her Ph.D. from the Weizmann Institute.

Elad Mark is COO at BiondVax. He has over 15 years of biotechnology industry experience encompassing diverse project stages including feasibility studies, conceptual and detailed design, commissioning, qualification and process validation. Prior to joining BiondVax, he led Novartis’s $800 million investment in a biologics facility in Singapore. With Biopharmax and Antero, both global pharmaceutical engineering companies, he successfully led projects in Israel, China and Singapore. He holds a BSc. in Engineering from the Afeka College of Engineering and an MBA from the Open University of Israel.

Uri Ben-Or is CFO at BiondVax. He has served as CFO with public life science companies traded on the Tel Aviv Stock Exchange, OTC Markets Group and Nasdaq. Ben-Or provides his services to BiondVax through CFO Direct, a company he founded and for which he serves as CEO. He served as the VP of Finance of Glycominds, a leading biotechnology company, and as CFO of a spin-off from Telrad Networks. He also served as a Corporate Controller at Menorah Capital Markets and as an Auditor at PWC. He holds a B.A. in Business from the College of Administration, an MBA from Bar-Ilan University, and is a Certified Public Accountant.

See also
Health care in Israel
Science and technology in Israel

References

Companies listed on the Nasdaq
Biopharmaceutical companies
Pharmaceutical companies of Israel